Óscar Antonio Pianetti Obelar (born October 1, 1942 in General Racedo (Entre Ríos), Argentina) is a former Argentine footballer currently playing for clubs of Argentina, Chile, Peru, Colombia and Ecuador.

Teams
  Boca Juniors 1964–1971
  Unión Tuamán 1972–1974
  Emelec 1975
  Colo-Colo 1975
  Deportes Quindío 1976–1979

Titles
  Boca Juniors 1964, 1965, 1969 and 1970 (Argentine Primera División Championship)

External links

 
 Óscar Pianetti at playmakerstats.com (English version of ceroacero.es)

1942 births
Living people
Argentine footballers
Argentine expatriate footballers
Boca Juniors footballers
Colo-Colo footballers
C.S. Emelec footballers
Deportes Quindío footballers
Chilean Primera División players
Argentine Primera División players
Categoría Primera A players
Expatriate footballers in Chile
Expatriate footballers in Colombia
Expatriate footballers in Ecuador
Expatriate footballers in Peru
Association football forwards
People from Diamante Department
Sportspeople from Entre Ríos Province